The Australia cricket team toured India from February and March 2019 to play two Twenty20 International (T20I) and five One Day International (ODI) matches. The ODI fixtures were part of both teams' preparation for the 2019 Cricket World Cup. Australia won the T20I series 2–0, their first T20I series win against India.

India won the first two ODIs of the series, and with their victory in the second match, registered their 500th win in the format. India became the second team, after Australia, to record 500 wins in ODIs. Despite losing the first two matches, Australia went on to win the ODI series 3–2. It was the first time that Australia had won an ODI series in India since 2009. It was also the first series loss for India at home since losing 2–3 to South Africa in October 2015, and Virat Kohli's first ODI series loss at home.

Squads

Shaun Marsh was included in Australia's ODI squad, with D'Arcy Short named as cover for Marsh. Andrew Tye replaced Kane Richardson in Australia's ODI squad after Richardson was ruled out due to injury.

Siddarth Kaul was selected for first two ODIs, with Bhuvneshwar Kumar replacing him for remaining three ODIs in India's ODI squad. Ahead of the tour, Hardik Pandya was ruled out of India's squads due to injury. Ravindra Jadeja replaced him in India's ODI squad, but no replacement was made in their T20I squad. MS Dhoni was rested for the final two ODIs of the series, with Rishabh Pant named as the wicket-keeper in India's squad in his place.

T20I series

1st T20I

2nd T20I

ODI series

1st ODI

2nd ODI

3rd ODI

4th ODI

5th ODI

References

External links
 Series home at ESPN Cricinfo

2019 in Australian cricket
2019 in Indian cricket
International cricket competitions in 2018–19
Australian cricket tours of India